Lophophanes is a small genus of birds in the family Paridae. The genus name is from the Ancient Greek lophos, "crest", and phaino, "to show".

It contains the following species:

References

 
Bird genera